Berezovka is a rural locality (a selo) and the administrative center of Beryozovsky Selsoviet, Charyshsky District, Altai Krai, Russia. The population was 722 as of 2013. It was founded in 1776. There are 13 streets.

Geography 
Berezovka is located 18 km south of Charyshskoye (the district's administrative centre) by road. Komendantka is the nearest rural locality.

References 

Rural localities in Tselinny District, Altai Krai